Ghostforce (also named Ghost Force) is a French CGI animated series created by Jeremy Zag that premiered on TFOU in France on August 28, 2021. The show is licensed by Disney for international distribution; in the United States, it premiered on Disney XD on October 4, 2021 before premiering on its main home Disney Channel on November 8.

The first season of series consists of 56 episodes, 52 11-minute episodes and 4 22-minute episodes, along with a live-action film produced by 1492 Pictures and Cross Creek Pictures.

A second season is currently in production.

Premise
In New York City, three middle school kids working as a team of superheroes known as the Ghost Force who must protect the city from the ghosts, which are invisible to the human eye. These ghosts use fright as fuel to increase their power and ability to affect the world around them. The ghosts have a basic form and a booster form which can be obtained when they merge with specific items. When a ghost is defeated, the Ghostforce use Technoghost containers to contain them. Once the ghost is contained, the damages they did are undone.

Characters

Ghostforce
 Andy Baker (voiced by Enzo Ratsito in the French version and by Jordan Quisno in the English dub) is one of the main protagonists of Ghostforce. He is a student in Professor Pascal's class at NYC school in Manhattan, New York, despite being the oldest of the trio, suggesting he was held back. Using the power of his Ectocap, Andy transforms into the superhero Fury, gaining slime-based powers to stop the paranormal ghosts that terrorize the city.
 Dragoyle is a dragon/gargoyle-like ghost who resides in Fury's Boo Cap.
 Michael "Mike" Collins Jr. (voiced by Hervé Grull in the French version and by Ogie Banks in the English dub) is one of the main protagonists of Ghostforce. He is the youngest student of Professor Pascal's class at NYC school in Manhattan, New York, due to him skipping a grade. Using the power of his Ectocap, Mike transforms into the superhero Krush, gaining the power of ice creation to stop the paranormal ghosts that terrorize the city.
 Growmax is an ice cube-shaped ghost who resides in Krush's Boo Cap.
 Liv Baker (voiced by Laure Filiu in the French version and by Cassandra Lee Morris in the English dub) is one of the main protagonists of Ghostforce. She is a student in Professor Pascal's class at NYC school in Manhattan, New York and the younger sister of Andy. Using the power of her Ectocap, Liv transforms into the superheroine Myst, gaining the power of portal creation to stop the paranormal ghosts that terrorize the city.
 Octocat is an octopus/cat-like ghost who resides in Myst's Boo Cap.
 Glowboo (voiced by Cedric Williams in the English dub) is the android member of Ghostforce.
 Miss Jones is a science teacher at the unnamed NYC school. She is the half-ghost mentor of the Ghostforce and the creator of Glowboo.
 Glups is Miss Jones' pet ghost.

Supporting characters
 Jay Baker (voiced by Nick Hudson Murdoch in the English dub) is the father of Andy and Liv who is a film director and camera operator.
 Melissa Baker is the mother of Andy and Liv who is a film director.
 Michael Collins Sr. (voiced by Ogie Banks in the English dub) is the father of Mike who is a wealthy basketball player.
 Mr. Vladovsky (voiced by Nick Hudson Murdock in the English dub) is the strict principal of the unnamed NYC school.
 Professor Pascal (voiced by Nick Hudson Murdock in the English dub) is a teacher at the unnamed NYC school who works as a chemistry teacher, a history teacher, and a biology teacher.
 Asta is Profesor Pascal's dog.
 Drake Miller (voiced by Cedric Williams in the English dub) is a student at the unnamed NYC school and a professional basketball player who is Andy's rival.
 Bobby is Drake's loyal acquaintance.
 Charlie is a student at the unnamed NYC school who is a fan of the Ghostforce and likes Krush.
 Jane is a student at the unnamed NYC school who is a cheerleader.
 Stacy is a student at the unnamed NYC school who is Jane's twin sister and is also a cheerleader.
 Mario is an African-American student at the unnamed NYC school who acts cool.
 Carla is a student at the unnamed NYC school who is Andy's love interest.
 Rajat is an Indian-American student at the unnamed NYC school and the most intelligent member of Professor Pascal's class.
 Tim Callaghan is a police lieutenant who often helps citizens in trouble even when ghosts attack.

Episodes

Home media
Shout! Factory Kids signed a deal with ZAG Heroez to secure the North American DVD rights to Ghostforce. Other media companies that will produce home media include Eagle Pictures in Italy, Edel in Germany, and Dazzler Media in the United Kingdom.

Production
Originally, the series was originally going to be a CGI/live-action hybrid.

References

External links
 Ghost Force at TF1 
 

2021 French television series debuts
2020s French animated television series
French children's animated action television series
French children's animated adventure television series
French children's animated comedy television series
French children's animated horror television series
French children's animated superhero television series
Italian children's animated action television series
Italian children's animated adventure television series
Italian children's animated comedy television series
Italian children's animated superhero television series
South Korean children's animated action television series
South Korean children's animated adventure television series
South Korean children's animated comedy television series
South Korean children's animated superhero television series
Anime-influenced Western animated television series
French-language television shows
French computer-animated television series
Italian computer-animated television series
Animated television series about ghosts
Animated television series about robots
Teen animated television series
Television series by Method Animation